El Khroub is a town and commune in Constantine Province, Algeria. According to the 2008 census it has a population of 179,033.

Demographics

History 

10 km east of the city, on the National Road 20, there is the site of Bou Nouara  known for its dolmens.

References

Communes of Constantine Province
Cities in Algeria
Constantine Province